Mohammad Azam (born 23 October 1980) is a cricketer who played for the United Arab Emirates national cricket team. He is a Left-hand batsman and Left-arm orthodox bowler. He made First class debut against Ireland in ICC Intercontinental Cup in 2013 

He made his List A debut against Ireland in ICC World Cricket League in 2013  He made T20 debut against Ireland on 21 March 2013.
On 11 August 2013 he played a match winning knock against Canada in T20.

References

External links
 

1980 births
Living people
Emirati cricketers
Pakistani expatriate sportspeople in the United Arab Emirates